Tarun Das is an Indian industrialist, corporate executive, writer and a former Chief Mentor of the Confederation of Indian Industry (CII). He served CII from 1967 to 2004 as its director general and from 2004 to 2009 as its chief mentor.

Das, who did his college education at the University of Calcutta and Manchester University, is a recipient of honoris causa degree of Doctor of Science (DSc) from the University of Warwick. He has chaired the U.S.-India Strategic Dialogue and the U.S.-India -Japan Strategic Dialogue and has served many corporate houses such as Haldia Petrochemicals, Associated Cement Companies, John Keells Holdings, Asian Hotels and Properties, Bajaj Auto Finance and New Delhi Television as their director. A former member of the International Advisory Board of Coca-Cola, he is a trustee of the Indian chapter of the Aspen Institute. The Government of India awarded him the third highest civilian honour of the Padma Bhushan, in 2006, for his contributions to Indian trade and industry.

Das' name was mentioned in the media reports related to Radia tapes controversy which was later refuted by him. He has delivered several keynote addresses; his lecture on Adapting Indian industry to globalisation at the golden jubilee of the Forum for Free Entrepreneurs in Mumbai in 2006 is one such address. He has published a book, Crossing Frontiers: The Journey of Building CII, which is an account of his years at the Confederation of Indian Industry.

See also 
 Confederation of Indian Industry

References

External links 
 

Recipients of the Padma Bhushan in trade and industry
Year of birth missing (living people)
Writers from West Bengal
Indian industrialists
Indian corporate directors
Indian economics writers
University of Calcutta alumni
Alumni of the University of Manchester
Businesspeople from West Bengal
Living people